Minhaj means "way" or "path" in Arabic. Minhaj may refer to:

Minhaj-i-Siraj, 13th-century Persian historian of India
Minhajul Abedin, Bangladeshi cricketer
Minhajul Abedin Afridi, Bangladeshi cricketer
Minhajul Abedin Nannu, former captain of Bangladesh national cricket team
Minhajul Arfin Azad, Indian Bengali politician
Minhaz Merchant, Indian journalist
Hasan Minhaj, Indian-American comedian and actor

See also 
Manhaj (disambiguation)
Nicki Minaj (born 1982), US-based rapper
Minhag
Minhas

Islamic terminology